Jivaromyia is a genus of crane fly in the family Limoniidae.

Distribution
Ecuador.

Species
J. problematica Alexander, 1943

References

Limoniidae
Tipulomorpha genera
Diptera of South America